One Day at a Time is the 11th studio album by Joan Baez, released in January 1970. Recorded in Nashville, the album was a continuation of Baez' experimentation with country music, begun with the previous year's David's Album. It is significant in that it was the first to include Baez' own compositions, "Sweet Sir Galahad" and "A Song for David", the former song a ballad for her younger sister Mimi Fariña, and the latter song being for her then-husband, David Harris, at the time in prison as a conscientious objector. One Day at a Time also included work by The Rolling Stones, Willie Nelson, and Pete Seeger.

The album contains three of the songs Baez had performed at Woodstock four months earlier: "I Live One Day at a Time", "Joe Hill", and "Sweet Sir Galahad".

The Vanguard reissue contains two outtakes from the One Day at a Time sessions: "Sing Me Back Home" and "Mama Tried", both duets with Jeffrey Shurtleff, and both Merle Haggard covers. (The two cuts had first appeared on Baez' 1993 boxed set Rare, Live & Classic).  (The recording of "Mama Tried" includes an initial aborted take, interrupted when session guitarist Jerry Reed's finger becomes stuck between his guitar strings, followed by laughter by all present at Reed's mishap; the musicians and Baez then regain composure and perform a second take of the song.)

Track listing
"Sweet Sir Galahad" (Joan Baez) – 3:43
"No Expectations" (Mick Jagger, Keith Richards) – 3:47
"Long Black Veil" (Marijohn Wilkin, Danny Dill) – 3:24
"Ghetto" (Homer Banks, Bonnie Bramlett, Bettye Crutcher) – 4:33
"Carry It On" (Pete Seeger, Gil Turner) – 2:22
"Take Me Back to the Sweet Sunny South" (Traditional) (duet with Jeffrey Shurtleff) – 2:47
"Seven Bridges Road" (Steve Young) (duet with Shurtleff) – 3:42
"Jolie Blonde" (Traditional) – 2:00
"Joe Hill" (Alfred Hayes, Earl Robinson) – 3:25
"A Song for David" (Baez) – 4:57
"(I Live) One Day at a Time" (Willie Nelson) (duet with Shurtleff) – 3:31

Reissue bonus tracks
"Mama Tried" (Merle Haggard) (duet with Shurtleff) - 3:13
"Sing Me Back Home" (Merle Haggard) (duet with Shurtleff) - 2:53

Personnel 

 Joan Baez – vocals, guitar
 Pete Drake – pedal steel guitar
 Roy Huskey, Jr. – bass guitar
 Tommy Jackson – fiddle
 Jerry Shook – guitar
 Jerry Reed – guitar
 Harold Bradley – guitar
 Hargus "Pig" Robbins – piano
 Harold Rugg – steel guitar, dobro
 Grady Martin – guitar, dobro, sitar
 Buddy Spicher – fiddle
 Norbert Putnam – bass guitar
 Kenny Buttrey – drums
 David Briggs – piano, harpsichord
 Richard Festinger – guitar
 Charlie McCoy – harmonica, vibraphone, organ
 Henry Strzelecki – bass guitar
 Pete Wade – guitar
Technical
 Jim Marshall – photography

Charts

References

1970 albums
Joan Baez albums
Albums produced by Maynard Solomon
Vanguard Records albums
Country albums by American artists